Sulaiman Nasser (Arabic:سليمان ناصر) (born 23 June 1997) is an Emirati footballer who plays as a midfielder.

Career

Al-Ain
Sulaiman Nasser started his career at Al Ain and is a product of the Al-Ain's youth system. On 6 April 2017, Sulaiman Nasser made his professional debut for Al-Ain against Al Dhafra in the Pro League, replacing Ahmed Barman.

Ajman
On 4 July 2020, he left Al Ain and signed with Ajman.

References

External links
 

1997 births
Living people
Emirati footballers
Al Ain FC players
Ajman Club players
UAE Pro League players
Association football midfielders
Place of birth missing (living people)